Transacqua was a comune (municipality) in Trentino in the northern Italian region Trentino-Alto Adige/Südtirol, located about  east of Trento. It was merged with Siror, Tonadico and Fiera di Primiero on January 1, 2016, to form a new municipality, Primiero San Martino di Castrozza.

The municipality of Transacqua contains the frazioni (subdivisions, mainly villages and hamlets) Ormanico (Hermannich) and Pieve.

Transacqua borders the following municipalities: Siror (Siraur), Sagron Mis (Sagraun), Mezzano (Matzan im Taufers), Cesiomaggiore, Tonadico (Thunadich) and Fiera di Primiero (Markt Primör).

Demographic evolution

References

External links
 Homepage of the city

Cities and towns in Trentino-Alto Adige/Südtirol